David van Dantzig (September 23, 1900 – July 22, 1959) was a Dutch mathematician, well known for the construction in topology of the dyadic solenoid. He was a member of the Significs Group.

Biography 
Born to a Jewish family in Amsterdam in 1900, Van Dantzig started to study Chemistry at the University of Amsterdam in 1917, where Gerrit Mannoury lectured. He received his PhD at the University of Groningen in 1931 with a thesis entitled "" under supervision of Bartel Leendert van der Waerden.

He was appointed professor at the Delft University of Technology in 1938, and at the University of Amsterdam in 1946.
Among his doctoral students were Jan Hemelrijk (1950), Johan Kemperman (1950), David Johannes Stoker (1955), and Constance van Eeden (1958). In Amsterdam he was one of the founders of the Mathematisch Centrum. At the University of Amsterdam he was succeeded by Jan Hemelrijk.

Originally working on topics in differential geometry and topology, after World War II he focused on probability, emphasizing the applicability to statistical hypothesis testing.

In 1949 he became member of the Royal Netherlands Academy of Arts and Sciences.

In response to the North Sea flood of 1953, the Dutch Government established the Delta Committee, and asked Van Dantzig to develop a mathematical approach to formulate and solve the economic cost-benefit decision model concerning optimal dike height problems in connection with the Delta Works. The work of the Delta Committee, including the work by Van Dantzig, finally resulted in statutory minimal safety standards.

Publications 
Books, a selection:
 1931. Studien over topologische algebra. Doctoral thesis University of Groningen.
 1932. Over de elementen van het wiskundig denken : voordracht. Rede Delft. Groningen : Noordhoff.
 1938. Vragen en schijnvragen over ruimte en tijd : een toepassing van den wiskundigen denkvorm.  Inaugurale rede Technische Hogeschool te Delft
 1948. De functie der wetenschap : drie voordrachten, met discussie. With E.W. Beth and C.F.P. Stutterheim. 's-Gravenhage : Leopold

Articles, a selection:
 D. van Dantzig, C. Scheffer "On hereditary time discrete stochastic processes, considered as stationary Markov chains, and the corresponding general form of Wald’s fundamental identity," Indag. Math. (16), No.4, (1954), p. 377–388
 Dantzig, D. van. 1956. Economic decision problems for flood prevention. Econometrica 24(3) 276–287.

References

External links 

 
 

1900 births
1959 deaths
Dutch Jews
Dutch statisticians
20th-century Dutch mathematicians
University of Groningen alumni
Academic staff of the Delft University of Technology
Academic staff of the University of Amsterdam
Fellows of the American Statistical Association
Scientists from Amsterdam
Members of the Royal Netherlands Academy of Arts and Sciences